Eva Kusuma Sundari (born in Nganjuk Regency, 8 October 1965) is a member of the House of Representatives (People's Representative Council) who represents East Java. She is assigned to the Commission III which handles the Ministry of Law and Human Rights, the Attorney General of Indonesia and the Indonesian National Police.

Eva Kusuma is known to be a critical member of the PDI Perjuangan party. Sundari was elected since 2009 and was re-nominated as a member of the House of Representatives in 2014 for Blitar, Kediri and Tulungagung.

Sundari is also a member of Subud. She is also a member of the Indonesian Women's Coalition (KPI) and East Java Women's Caucus Education Division.

Eva Kusuma Sundari has obtained an MA degree in Politics of Alternative Development in 1990 from the International Institute of Social Studies (ISS), in The Hague, the Netherlands.

References 

1965 births
Living people
Indonesian Democratic Party of Struggle politicians
People from Nganjuk Regency
Subud members
Members of the People's Representative Council, 2004
Members of the People's Representative Council, 2009
Members of the People's Representative Council, 2014
Women members of the People's Representative Council